ZMP can refer to:
 Zero marginal product (with reference to marginal product of labor)
 Zero moment point, a physical concept used in legged-robot locomotion
 ZMP, a Japanese robotics company
 Związek Młodzieży Polskiej (Union of Polish Youth)
 Minneapolis Air Route Traffic Control Center, abbreviated ZMP